These hits topped the Ultratop 50 in 2023.

See also
 List of number-one albums of 2023 (Belgium)
 2023 in music

References

Ultratop 50
Belgium Ultratop 50
2023